"Rendezvous in a Dark Place" is the sixtieth episode and the twenty-fifth episode of the third season (1988–89) of the television series The Twilight Zone. In this episode, an elderly woman meets the personification of Death and tries to persuade him to take her.

Plot
Elderly Barbara LeMay gets great joy out of attending funerals for people she does not know. Her son Jason is upset at this hobby of hers and, to a greater extent, her refusal to agree to have Thanksgiving with Jason, his wife, and their children because she "can't make any long-range plans." He tells her she has an unhealthy obsession with death.

That night, a man named Trent breaks into Barbara's home and keeps Barbara at gunpoint. Injured and bleeding, he passes out. Barbara turns on the radio and hears that a local liquor store was robbed; she deduces Trent is the robber. She nurses him as best as she can but is quick to conclude that he is dying. He begs her not to take him to the hospital but requests that he not die alone. Another man enters the house, who Barbara recognizes as Death. Barbara is excited and talks to him in the manner of a fan to a celebrity. She asks Death to take her instead of Trent, saying Trent does not appreciate him the way she does. Death denies her and says he cannot take a life where there is none, because she embraces him while others resist him. Death takes Trent and leaves. Barbara begins sobbing, thinking Death would not take her because she is not good enough for him.

After Trent's body is taken away, Death visits Barbara to comfort her. She explains that because he took everyone she loved, she became jealous and her love transferred to him. Her husband was in great pain before he died; she found that she could not take away his pain, but Death could. She considered suicide, but felt it to be "too forward"; she wants Death to take her willingly. Death offers his hand and brings her where she is "most needed." They appear in a hospital, where Barbara, now dressed in black, goes to a man who is dying and offers him comfort, taking him just as Death took Trent. Death commends her on a job well done.

See also
Harold and Maude, a 1971 film about a young man who attends funerals as a hobby
"Nothing in the Dark", an original series Twilight Zone episode in which an elderly woman can see and talk to Death

External links
 

1989 American television episodes
The Twilight Zone (1985 TV series season 3) episodes
Television episodes about personifications of death

fr:Un rendez-vous tant attendu